Willie Cunningham may refer to:

Willie Cunningham (footballer, born 1925) (1925–2000), Scottish footballer
Willie Cunningham (footballer, born 1938), Scottish footballer
Willie Cunningham (Northern Irish footballer) (1930–2007), Northern Irish footballer

See also
William Cunningham (disambiguation)